The 2012–13 Sacramento Surge season was the first season of the Sacramento Surge professional indoor soccer club. The Surge, a Pacific Division team in the Professional Arena Soccer League, played their home games in the Off the Wall Soccer Arena in Sacramento, California. The team was led by chairman Airrick Harvey and head coach Jorge Fernandez.

Season summary
The team struggled in the regular season, placing fifth in the PASL's five-team Pacific Division, and failed to advance to the postseason. The Surge compiled a 2–14 record with one win coming against Toros Mexico on January 19, 2013, and the other by forfeit when the Tacoma Stars announced they would not make the trip south for the final game of the regular season.

The Surge participated in the 2012–13 United States Open Cup for Arena Soccer. They lost to the Turlock Express in the Wild Card round, abruptly ending their run in the tournament.

History
In 1991 and 1992, Sacramento was home to the Sacramento Surge of the World League of American Football. The team won the 1992 World Bowl, the only North American team to do so. WLAF operations were suspended following the 1992 season and the Sacramento team disbanded. The soccer team is named in their honor.

Schedule

Regular season

† Game also counts for US Open Cup, as listed in chart below.

2012–13 US Open Cup for Arena Soccer

References

External links
Sacramento Surge official website
Off the Wall Soccer Arena official website

Sacramento Surge (MASL)
Sacramento Surge
Sacramento Surge 2012
Sacramento Surge 2012